Alexander Township may refer to:

 Alexander Township, Benton County, Missouri
 Alexander Township, Stutsman County, North Dakota, in Stutsman County, North Dakota
 Alexander Township, Athens County, Ohio

Township name disambiguation pages